Hotchkiss House may refer to:

Hotchkiss House (Monticello, Arkansas), listed on the NRHP in Arkansas
David Hotchkiss House, Prospect, Connecticut, listed on the NRHP in New Haven County, Connecticut
Fyler-Hotchkiss Estate, Torrington, Connecticut, listed on the NRHP in Connecticut
Jedediah Hotchkiss House, Windsor, New York, listed on the NRHP in New York